Samarskoye is a rural locality (a selo) in Azovsky District of Rostov Oblast, Russia, located on the Kagalnik River. Population:

References

Rural localities in Rostov Oblast